The 52nd season of The Late Late Show, the world's longest-running chat show, began on 6 September 2013 and concluded on 30 May 2014. Ryan Tubridy's fifth season as host, it aired on RTÉ One each Friday evening from 21:30.	

Local guests this season included Senator David Norris, Ombudsman Emily O'Reilly, John Wilson, Pádraig Harrington, Seán Óg Ó hAilpín, Joanne O'Riordan, Colin Farrell, Conor Lenihan, Lucinda Creighton, Mary Lou McDonald, Bob Geldof, Bosco, Brenda Fricker and Matt Cooper upon his return from North Korea. Brendan Gleeson and his sons Brian and Domhnall were all interviewed separately in different episodes (alongside the cast and crew of their latest projects) during March and April. Domhnall Gleeson also appeared alone in the season's opening episode in September.

Former Ireland rugby boss Warren Gatland was interviewed in October, while two of his successors, Joe Schmidt and Eddie O'Sullivan, were interviewed during consecutive episodes in January. Brian O'Driscoll and wife Amy Huberman featured in separate episodes (in October and in March) and Gordon D'Arcy and wife Aoife Cogan were interviewed together in May. International guests interviewed this season included astronaut Chris Hadfield, world chess champion Garry Kasparov, Sweden's Kevin Walker, South Africa's Francois Pienaar, KITT from Knight Rider, the cast of Anchorman and Richard Dreyfuss and Terry Gilliam (together) and Jonah Hill and Channing Tatum (together).

Musical guests this season included Wet Wet Wet, Cliff Richard, Midge Ure, Lang Lang, José Carreras, Clannad, Aslan, Something Happens, Delorentos, Villagers, Imelda May, O.R.B., Bell X1, Kodaline, Pixie Lott, Paolo Nutini and The Strypes.

Second episode
On 13 September 2013, Majella O'Donnell, the wife of singer Daniel O'Donnell, shaved off her hair on the show in aid of the Irish Cancer Society following her diagnosis with breast cancer. €400,000 was raised for charity as a result.

Fifth episode

Clare hurling team interview
On 4 October 2013, Clare hurling manager Davy Fitzgerald, along with players Shane O'Donnell and Patrick Donnellan, appeared as guests on the show to discuss the All-Ireland hurling final win and reaction. Davy Fitzgerald returned to the show in January.

Dolores O'Riordan revelation
Dolores O'Riordan confirmed she would be the new judge on The Voice of Ireland.

Sinéad O'Connor incident
Sinéad O'Connor used her appearance this season to discuss her feud with Miley Cyrus.

Fifteenth episode

On 13 December 2013, astronaut Chris Hadfield, in Ireland for a book signing the next day, was a guest. He performed his version of "Space Oddity". Such was his popularity, he returned as a guest two episodes later. Some reports suggested he was "the real star" of an episode that also featured the cast of Anchorman (though that sequence was pre-recorded).

Special editions
The season's edition of The Late Late Toy Show was broadcast on 29 November 2013. The show had a Mary Poppins theme, with Ryan Tubridy opening the show dressed as chimney sweep Bert and then tearing off his costume to reveal his Christmas jumper. Guests included Robbie Keane and Bosco.

The 2014 Eurosong Final was held on The Late Late Show on 28 February. The show descended into chaos as Tubridy lost control of his guests and one of the judges, Linda Martin, confronted one of the mentors, Billy McGuinness, live on national television, at one point rising from her seat and shouting that he was an "odious little man". Meanwhile, five acts performed, with one selected to represent Ireland at Eurovision Song Contest 2014 in Copenhagen. The winner of the national song contest was [...] with the song "[...]". But Martin v McGuinness grabbed all the headlines.

Episode list

References

External links
Official website

2013 Irish television seasons
2014 Irish television seasons
The Late Late Show (Irish talk show) seasons